The 2013 National Collegiate Roller Hockey Championships was the 15th national championship tournament for college inline hockey in the United States. The Division I tournament involved 24 teams to determine the national champion of the 2012–13 season at the Division I level of the National Collegiate Roller Hockey Association (NCRHA), the highest level of competition in college inline hockey. The tournament was hosted by the Southeastern Collegiate Roller Hockey League at the Fort Myers Skatium in Fort Myers, Florida.

Tournament procedure
The tournament consisted of 24 teams being divided into six pools of four, who play a three-game round robin within their pools. The teams were then seeded, based on pool standings, and advance to a five-round single elimination playoff.

Qualifying teams
The at-large bids for the tournament were announced on March 11. The pools and seeding for each team in the tournament were announced on March 25. The Eastern Collegiate Roller Hockey Association, Southeastern Collegiate Roller Hockey League and Western Collegiate Roller Hockey League each had five teams receive a berth in the tournament, Midwest Collegiate Roller Hockey League had four teams receive a berth, Great Plains Collegiate Inline Hockey League had three teams receive a berth, and the Southwest Collegiate Hockey League had two teams receive a berth.

Pool play
All times are local (UTC−4).

Pool A

Pool B

Pool C

Pool D

Pool E

Pool F

Elimination bracket

Note: * denotes overtime period(s)
All times are local (UTC−4).

First round

Second round

National quarterfinals

National semifinals

National championship

See also
2013 National Collegiate Roller Hockey Championships Division II
2013 National Collegiate Roller Hockey Championships Junior College Division
2013 National Collegiate Roller Hockey Championships B Division

Roller hockey competitions in the United States
Roller hockey in the United States
2013 in roller hockey
2013 in American sports